The McHenry County Conservation District (MCCD) is a conservation district located in McHenry County, Illinois, United States.

MCCD was founded in 1971 and manages and maintains approximately 25,000 acres of land throughout the county. This includes parks, conservation areas, campgrounds, bicycle trails, hiking trails, and horse trails.

Managed sites 

The following locations are directly managed by MCCD:

References

McHenry County, Illinois
Environmental organizations based in Illinois
Organizations established in 1971
1971 establishments in Illinois